Rekabdar Kola (also Romanized as Rekābdār Kolā and Rekābdār Kalā; also known as Seh Shanbeh Bāzār) is a village in Nowkand Kola Rural District, in the Central District of Qaem Shahr County, Mazandaran Province, Iran. At the 2006 census, its population was 619, in 178 families.

References 

Populated places in Qaem Shahr County